TVTV may refer to:
 tvtv Services, a Germany-based pan-European EPG service provider, owned by Gracenote.
 TVTV!, the name for Finnish youth TV channel Sub from February 2000 to August 2001.
 TVTV (video collective), a video collective active in San Francisco 1972 to 1979.
 TV TV Australia Pty Ltd, corporate owner of IceTV.